Katrin Hecker (born 11 July 1963) is a German former footballer who played as a defender, appearing for the East Germany national team in their first and only match on 9 May 1990.

Career

Clubs 
Hecker, who grew up in Lößnitz, played for the BSG Rotation Schlema, the reigning champion in football in the GDR, in the 1989/90 season.

After reunification, she came to Wolfsburg, where she played for VfL Wolfsburg.

National Team 
Hecker took part in the only international match of the GDR national team. They were beaten 3–0 on May 9, 1990, in the Karl Liebknecht Stadium in Potsdam's Babelsberg district against the Czechoslovakia national team in front of about 800 spectators.

International

References

External links

Literature 

 Women's football from A - Z: The encyclopedia of German women's football - by Ronny Galczynski ISBN 978-3-86910-169-9

1963 births
Living people
German women's footballers
East German women's footballers
East Germany women's international footballers
Women's association football midfielders
Association football midfielders
VfL Wolfsburg (women) players